The year 1976 in film involved some significant events.

Highest-grossing films (U.S.)

The top ten 1976 released films by box office gross in North America are as follows:

Events
January – Paramount Pictures sets up a separate motion picture division and names David V. Picker as president.
March 22 – Filming begins on George Lucas' Star Wars science fiction film. In one of the most lucrative business decisions in film history, Lucas declines his directing fee of $500,000 in exchange for complete ownership of merchandising and sequel rights.
April 1 – The Rocky Horror Picture Show is officially re-released as a midnight movie at the Waverly Theater (Now the IFC Center) in Greenwich Village in New York City, starting through the run and still being shown in there  all around the world.
April 9 – Alfred Hitchcock's last film, Family Plot, is released.
August 11 – John Wayne appears in his final film, The Shootist.
August 26 – Alan Ladd Jr. is promoted from head of worldwide production to president of 20th Century Fox's film division.
November 15 – Michael Eisner is brought in as president and CEO of Paramount Pictures.
November 21 – Rocky, the first in the film series opens.  It becomes the highest-grossing film released in the year and goes on to win the Academy Award for Best Picture.
December 5 – Bound for Glory debuts and is the first motion picture in which inventor/operator Garrett Brown used his new Steadicam for filming moving scenes, although its use had already been seen in Marathon Man and Rocky which were filmed later but released earlier.
December 17 - King Kong opens to the year's highest opening weekend gross and overall box office success.

Awards 

Palme d'Or (Cannes Film Festival):
Taxi Driver, directed by Martin Scorsese, United States

Golden Bear (Berlin Film Festival):
Buffalo Bill and the Indians, or Sitting Bull's History Lesson, directed by Robert Altman, United States

Notable films released in 1976
United States unless stated

#
7-Man Army (Ba dao lou zi), directed by Chang Cheh – (Hong Kong)
1900, directed by Bernardo Bertolucci, starring Robert De Niro, Gérard Depardieu, Dominique Sanda, Donald Sutherland – (Italy/France)

A
A Queda (The Fall) – (Brazil)
All the President's Men, directed by Alan J. Pakula, starring Dustin Hoffman, Robert Redford, Jason Robards, Martin Balsam, Hal Holbrook
The Anchorite (El anacoreta) – (Spain)
Any Day Now (Vandaag of morgen) – (Netherlands)
The Ascent (Voskhozhdeniye) – (U.S.S.R.) – Golden Bear winner
Assault on Precinct 13, directed by John Carpenter, starring Austin Stoker
Astral Factor, starring Stefanie Powers
At the Earth's Core, starring Peter Cushing and Doug McClure – (U.K.)

B
Baby Blue Marine, starring Jan-Michael Vincent
The Bad News Bears, directed by Michael Ritchie, starring Walter Matthau, Tatum O'Neal, Vic Morrow, Jackie Earle Haley
Barocco, directed by André Téchiné, starring Isabelle Adjani, Gérard Depardieu, Marie-France Pisier – (France); Winner of three César Awards for Best Actress, Best Cinematography, and Best Music.
Beach Guard in Winter (Čuvar plaže u zimskom periodu) – (Yugoslavia)
The Best Way to Walk (La meilleure façon de marcher) – (France)
The Big Bus, starring Joseph Bologna, Stockard Channing, John Beck
The Bingo Long Traveling All-Stars & Motor Kings, starring Billy Dee Williams, James Earl Jones, Richard Pryor
Black and White in Color (La Victoire en chantant), directed by Jean-Jacques Annaud – (France) – Academy Award for Best Foreign Language film
The Blank Generation, with Patti Smith Group, Television, Ramones and Talking Heads
Blue Puppy (Goluboy shchenok) – (U.S.S.R.)
Bobbie Jo and the Outlaw, starring Marjoe Gortner and Lynda Carter
Bound for Glory, a biopic of Woody Guthrie directed by Hal Ashby, starring David Carradine
Breaking Point, starring Bo Svenson, Robert Culp, John Colicos
The Bricklayers (Los albañiles) – (Mexico)
Brother and Sister (Ani Imouto) – (Japan)
Buffalo Bill and the Indians, or Sitting Bull's History Lesson, directed by Robert Altman, starring Paul Newman, Geraldine Chaplin, Burt Lancaster – Golden Bear winner
Bugsy Malone, directed by Alan Parker, starring Scott Baio and Jodie Foster – (U.K.)
Burnt Offerings, starring Karen Black, Oliver Reed, Bette Davis

C
Caddie, starring Helen Morse – (Australia)
Canoa (Canoe) – (Mexico)
Car Wash, starring Franklyn Ajaye and Richard Pryor
The Career of a Chambermaid (Telefoni bianchi), directed by Dino Risi – (Italy)
Caro Michele, directed by Mario Monicelli – (Italy)
Carrie, directed by Brian De Palma, starring Sissy Spacek, Piper Laurie, Amy Irving
The Cassandra Crossing, starring Sophia Loren, Richard Harris, Burt Lancaster, Ava Gardner, Lee Strasberg, Martin Sheen, O. J. Simpson – (U.K.)
A Child in the Crowd (Un enfant dans la foule) – (France)
Chinese Roulette (Chinesisches Roulette), directed by Rainer Werner Fassbinder – (West Germany)
Chitchor (Heart Stealer) – (India)
The Clown Murders
Cop (Strømer) – (Denmark)
Coup de Grâce (Der Fangschuß), directed by Volker Schlöndorff – (West Germany/France)
A Cricket in the Ear (Shturets v uhoto), directed by Georgi K. Stoyanov, starring Pavel Popandov, Tatyana Lolova, Itzhak Fintzi – (Bulgaria)

D
Deadly Hero, starring Don Murray and James Earl Jones
The Desert of the Tartars (Il deserto dei Tartari), starring Vittorio Gassman – (Italy/France/West Germany)
The Devil's Playground, directed by Fred Schepisi – (Australia)
Diary of the Dead, starring Geraldine Fitzgerald and Héctor Elizondo
The Divine Nymph (Divina creatura), starring Marcello Mastroianni and Terence Stamp – (Italy)
Dixie Dynamite, starring Warren Oates
Dogs, starring David McCallum, George Wyner and Linda Gray
Don's Party, directed by Bruce Beresford, starring Ray Barrett, John Hargreaves and Pat Bishop – (Australia)
Dona Flor and Her Two Husbands (Dona Flor e Seus Dois Maridos), starring Sônia Braga – (Brazil)
Les douze travaux d'Asterix (The Twelve Trials of Asterix) – (France)
Drum , starring Warren Oates and Yaphet Kotto

E
The Eagle Has Landed, starring Michael Caine and Donald Sutherland – (U.K./United States)
Eat My Dust, starring Ron Howard and Christopher Norris 
Embryo, directed by Ralph Nelson, starring Rock Hudson and Barbara Carrera
The Enforcer, starring Clint Eastwood, Harry Guardino, Tyne Daly
Escape from the Dark, starring Alastair Sim – (U.K.)

F
F comme Fairbanks (F Like Fairbanks), starring Patrick Dewaere and Miou-Miou – (France)
Face to Face (Ansikte mot ansikte), directed by Ingmar Bergman, starring Liv Ullmann and Erland Josephson – (Sweden)
Family Plot, directed by Alfred Hitchcock (his final film), starring Barbara Harris, Bruce Dern, Karen Black, William Devane
Farsighted for Two Diopters (Dva Dioptara Dalekogledstvo), directed by Petar B. Vasilev, starring Georgi Partsalev – (Bulgaria)
Fellini's Casanova, directed by Federico Fellini, starring Donald Sutherland – (Italy)
The Fifth Seal (Az ötödik pecsét), directed by Zoltán Fábri – (Hungary)
The First Nudie Musical, directed by Bruce Kimmel, starring Cindy Williams, Stephen Nathan, Diana Canova
The Food of the Gods, starring Marjoe Gortner, Pamela Franklin, Ralph Meeker, Ida Lupino
Freaky Friday, directed by Gary Nelson, starring Barbara Harris and Jodie Foster
From Noon till Three, starring Charles Bronson and Jill Ireland
The Front, directed by Martin Ritt, starring Woody Allen, Zero Mostel, Michael Murphy, Andrea Marcovicci, Herschel Bernardi
Fumō Chitai (Wasted Land) – (Japan)
Futureworld, starring Peter Fonda and Blythe Danner

G
Gable and Lombard, starring James Brolin and Jill Clayburgh
Gator, starring Burt Reynolds and Jerry Reed
Giv'at Halfon Eina Ona (Halfon Hill Doesn't Answer) – (Israel)
God Told Me To, starring Tony Lo Bianco, Deborah Raffin, Sandy Dennis
Griffin and Phoenix, starring Peter Falk and Jill Clayburgh
Grizzly, starring Christopher George
The Gumball Rally, starring Michael Sarrazin
Gus, starring Don Knotts and Ed Asner

H
Harlan County, USA – a documentary film
Harry and Walter Go to New York, starring James Caan, Elliott Gould, Diane Keaton, Michael Caine
Heart of Glass (Herz aus Glas), directed by Werner Herzog – (West Germany)
The House with Laughing Windows (La casa dalle finestre che ridono) – (Italy)

I
Illustrious Corpses (Cadaveri eccellenti), directed by Francesco Rosi, starring Lino Ventura – (Italy)
The Inheritance (L'eredità Ferramonti), starring Anthony Quinn and Dominique Sanda – (Italy)
In the Realm of the Senses (Ai no Korīda), directed by Nagisa Oshima – (Japan)
L'innocente, directed by Luchino Visconti – (Italy)
The Inugamis (Inugami-ke no ichizoku), directed by Kon Ichikawa – (Japan)
I Will, I Will... for Now, directed by Norman Panama, starring Elliott Gould, Diane Keaton, Victoria Principal

J
Jackson County Jail, starring Tommy Lee Jones and Yvette Mimieux
J. D.'s Revenge, starring Glynn Turman and Louis Gossett Jr.
Je t'aime moi non plus (I Love You...Me Neither), directed by Serge Gainsbourg, starring Jane Birkin and Joe Dallesandro – (France)
Jonah Who Will Be 25 in the Year 2000 (Jonas qui aura 25 ans en l'an 2000) – (Switzerland/France)
The Judge and the Assassin (Le Juge et l'assassin), directed by Bertrand Tavernier, starring Philippe Noiret and Isabelle Huppert – (France)

K
Kabhie Kabhie (Sometimes), starring Shashi Kapoor – (India)
Kalicharan – (India)
The Killer Inside Me, starring Stacy Keach
The Killing of a Chinese Bookie, directed by John Cassavetes, starring Ben Gazzara, Timothy Carey, Seymour Cassel
King Kong, directed by John Guillermin, starring Jessica Lange, Jeff Bridges, Charles Grodin
King Kung Fu, directed by and starring Lance D. Hayes
Kings of the Road (Im Lauf der Zeit), directed by Wim Wenders – (West Germany)

L
The Last Hard Men, starring Charlton Heston and James Coburn
The Last Supper (La Última Cena) – (Cuba)
The Last Tycoon, directed by Elia Kazan, starring Robert De Niro, Tony Curtis, Robert Mitchum, Ray Milland, Jeanne Moreau, Jack Nicholson
Leadbelly, a biopic directed by Gordon Parks
Lipstick, starring Margaux Hemingway, Mariel Hemingway, Chris Sarandon
The Little Girl Who Lives Down the Lane, starring Jodie Foster and Martin Sheen
Logan's Run, directed by Michael Anderson, starring Michael York, Richard Jordan, Jenny Agutter

M
Mako: The Jaws of Death, directed by William Grefe, starring Richard Jaeckel
The Man on the Roof (Mannen på taket), directed by Bo Widerberg – (Sweden)
The Man Who Fell to Earth, directed by Nicolas Roeg, starring David Bowie, Rip Torn, Candy Clark – (U.K.)
Marecek, Pass Me the Pen! (Marečku, podejte mi pero!) – (Czechoslovakia)
Marathon Man, directed by John Schlesinger, starring Dustin Hoffman, Laurence Olivier, Roy Scheider, Marthe Keller, William Devane
The Marquise of O, directed by Éric Rohmer – (West Germany/France)
Massacre at Central High, directed by Rene Daalder
Master of the Flying Guillotine (a.k.a. One-Armed Boxer 2), starring Jimmy Wang – (Taiwan/Hong Kong)
A Matter of Time, directed by Vincente Minnelli, starring Ingrid Bergman, Liza Minnelli, Charles Boyer, Isabella Rossellini – (U.S./Italy)
Max Havelaar, directed by Fons Rademakers – (Netherlands)
The Memory of Justice, a documentary film by Marcel Ophüls – (France/West Germany/U.K./U.S.)
Midway, starring Charlton Heston, Henry Fonda, Toshiro Mifune, Glenn Ford, Robert Mitchum, Hal Holbrook
Mikey and Nicky, directed by Elaine May, starring John Cassavetes and Peter Falk
The Missouri Breaks, directed by Arthur Penn, starring Marlon Brando and Jack Nicholson
Mohammad, Messenger of God, directed by Moustapha Akkad, starring Anthony Quinn – (Morocco/Libya)
Mother, Jugs & Speed, directed by Peter Yates, starring Bill Cosby, Raquel Welch, Harvey Keitel
Mr. Klein, directed by Joseph Losey, starring Alain Delon and Jeanne Moreau – (France)
Murder by Death, starring Peter Sellers, David Niven, Maggie Smith, Alec Guinness, Peter Falk, Eileen Brennan, Elsa Lanchester, James Coco, Truman Capote
The Mysterious Monsters, starring Peter Graves and Peter Hurkos

N
Network, directed by Sidney Lumet, starring Peter Finch, William Holden, Faye Dunaway, Robert Duvall
The Next Man, starring Sean Connery
Next Stop, Greenwich Village, starring Shelley Winters, Lenny Baker, Ellen Greene
Nickelodeon, directed by Peter Bogdanovich, starring Ryan O'Neal, Burt Reynolds, Tatum O'Neal, John Ritter, Stella Stevens
Nightmare in Badham County, starring Deborah Raffin and Chuck Connors
No Deposit, No Return, starring David Niven, Darren McGavin, Don Knotts, Barbara Feldon, Kim Richards

O
Obsession, directed by Brian De Palma, starring Cliff Robertson, Geneviève Bujold, John Lithgow
Ode to Billy Joe, directed by Max Baer Jr., starring Robby Benson, Glynnis O'Connor, James Best
The Omen, directed by Richard Donner, starring Gregory Peck, Lee Remick, David Warner, Billie Whitelaw, Leo McKern – (UK/US)
One Summer Love, aka Dragonfly, directed by Gilbert Cates, starring Susan Sarandon and Beau Bridges
The Outlaw Josey Wales, directed by and starring Clint Eastwood, with Chief Dan George, Sam Bottoms, Sondra Locke, John Vernon
Oz or 20th Century Oz, a Rock 'N' Roll Road Movie, starring Bruce Spence, Joy Dunstan – (Australia)

P
The Pink Panther Strikes Again, starring Peter Sellers, Herbert Lom, Lesley-Anne Down – (U.K.)

R
Raise Ravens (Cria Cuervos), directed by Carlos Saura, starring Geraldine Chaplin – (Spain)
The Rat Savior (Izbavitelj) – (Yugoslavia)
Rich Man, Poor Man, television mini-series, starring Nick Nolte and Peter Strauss
The Ritz, directed by Richard Lester, starring Jack Weston, Rita Moreno, Jerry Stiller
Robin and Marian, directed by Richard Lester, starring Sean Connery, Audrey Hepburn, Robert Shaw – (UK/US)
Rocky, directed by John G. Avildsen, starring Sylvester Stallone, Burgess Meredith, Carl Weathers, Talia Shire, Burt Young

S
The Sailor Who Fell from Grace with the Sea, starring Kris Kristofferson and Sarah Miles
Salon Kitty, directed by Tinto Brass, starring Helmut Berger and Ingrid Thulin – (Italy/West Germany/France)
The Scar (film), directed by Krzysztof Kieślowski
Sebastiane, directed by Derek Jarman – (U.K.)
Seclusion Near a Forest (Na samotě u lesa), directed by Jiří Menzel – (Czechoslovakia)
The Sell Out, starring Richard Widmark 
Seven Beauties (Pasqualino Settebellezze), starring Fernando Rey – (Italy)
The Seven-Per-Cent Solution, a Sherlock Holmes mystery directed by Herbert Ross, starring Nicol Williamson as Holmes, Robert Duvall as Watson, Alan Arkin as Sigmund Freud, and Laurence Olivier as Moriarty – (UK/US)
Shadow of Angels (Schatten der Engel), starring Ingrid Caven and Rainer Werner Fassbinder – (Switzerland)
The Shaggy D.A., starring Dean Jones and Suzanne Pleshette
Sherlock Holmes in New York, directed by Boris Sagal, starring Roger Moore as Sherlock Holmes and Patrick Macnee as Watson
The Shootist, directed by Don Siegel, starring John Wayne (his final film), Lauren Bacall, Ron Howard, Richard Boone, Harry Morgan, James Stewart
Shout at the Devil, starring Lee Marvin, Roger Moore – (U.K.)
Silent Movie, directed by and starring Mel Brooks, with Marty Feldman, Dom DeLuise, Bernadette Peters
Silver Streak, directed by Arthur Hiller, starring Gene Wilder, Richard Pryor, Jill Clayburgh, Ned Beatty, Ray Walston, Patrick McGoohan
Sister Street Fighter – Fifth Level Fist (Onna hissatsu godan ken) – (Japan)
Sky Riders, starring James Coburn, Susannah York, Robert Culp
The Slipper and the Rose, directed by Bryan Forbes, starring Gemma Craven and Richard Chamberlain – (U.K.)
Small Change (L'Argent de poche), directed by François Truffaut – (France)
The Smurfs and the Magic Flute (La Flûte à six schtroumpfs) – (Belgium)
Snuff – (Argentina/U.S.)
The Song Remains the Same, featuring Led Zeppelin – (UK/US)
Soy un delincuente (I Am a Criminal) – (Venezuela)
Sparkle, starring Irene Cara
A Star Is Born, starring Barbra Streisand and Kris Kristofferson
Stay Hungry, directed by Bob Rafelson, starring Jeff Bridges, Sally Field, Arnold Schwarzenegger
St. Ives, directed by J. Lee Thompson, starring Charles Bronson
Storm Boy, starring David Gulpilil – (Australia)
Swashbuckler, starring Robert Shaw
The Swiss Conspiracy, starring David Janssen and Elke Sommer
Sybil, starring Joanne Woodward and Sally Field

T
Taxi Driver, directed by Martin Scorsese, starring Robert De Niro, Cybill Shepherd, Harvey Keitel, Albert Brooks, Peter Boyle, Jodie Foster
The Tenant (Le Locataire), directed by and starring Roman Polanski, with Isabelle Adjani and Melvyn Douglas – (France)
That's Entertainment, Part II, documentary featuring Fred Astaire and Gene Kelly
Tatlong taong walang Diyos (Three Godless Years) – (Philippines)
To Fly!, a documentary film
To the Devil a Daughter, starring Richard Widmark, Christopher Lee, Honor Blackman, Nastassja Kinski – (U.K.)
Todo modo, starring Gian Maria Volonté and Marcello Mastroianni – (Italy)
Tosun Paşa – (Turkey)
The Town That Dreaded Sundown, starring Ben Johnson and Dawn Wells
Trackdown, starring James Mitchum
Tracks, directed by Henry Jaglom, starring Dennis Hopper
Treasure of Matecumbe, starring Joan Hackett, Robert Foxworth, Peter Ustinov
The Twist, directed by Claude Chabrol, starring Bruce Dern, Stéphane Audran, Charles Aznavour, Ann-Margret – (France)
Two-Minute Warning, starring Charlton Heston, John Cassavetes, David Janssen, Jack Klugman, Gena Rowlands, Walter Pidgeon, Beau Bridges

U
Ugly, Dirty and Bad (Brutti, sporchi e cattivi), directed by Ettore Scola, starring Nino Manfredi – (Italy)
Up!, directed by Russ Meyer, featuring Raven De La Croix

V
Vigilante Force, starring Kris Kristofferson and Victoria Principal
Voyage of the Damned, starring Faye Dunaway, Lee Grant, James Mason, Katharine Ross, Max von Sydow, Orson Welles, Oskar Werner – (U.K.)

W
W.C. Fields and Me, starring Rod Steiger, Valerie Perrine, Jack Cassidy
Wan Pipel (One People) – (Suriname/Netherlands)
Welcome to L.A., directed by Alan Rudolph, starring Keith Carradine, Geraldine Chaplin, Sally Kellerman, Harvey Keitel
The White Ship (Belyy parokhod) – (U.S.S.R.)
Who Can Kill a Child? (¿Quién puede matar a un niño?) – (Spain)
Won Ton Ton, the Dog Who Saved Hollywood, starring Madeline Kahn, Teri Garr, Bruce Dern, Art Carney

1976 Wide-release movies

January–March

April–June

July–September

October–December

Births
January 2 – Paz Vega, Spanish actress
January 6
Johnny Yong Bosch, American actor, voice actor
Danny Pintauro, American actor
January 8 - Jenny Lewis, American singer-songwriter, musician and actress
January 13 – Michael Peña, American actor
January 15 - Dorian Missick, American actor
January 18 - Derek Richardson (actor), American actor
January 20 - Wayne Bastrup, American actor and musician
January 21 – Lars Eidinger, German film, television and stage actor
January 27 - Chris Gauthier, English-born Canadian actor
January 28 – Lee Ingleby, English film, television and stage actor
February 3
Isla Fisher, Australian actress
Tim Heidecker, American comedian, writer, director, actor and musician
February 5
Abhishek Bachchan, Indian actor
Tony Jaa, Thai actor, martial artist, director and stuntman
February 9 – Charlie Day, American actor, screenwriter, producer, comedian, director and musician
February 11 – Brice Beckham, American actor
February 14 - Erica Leerhsen, American actress
February 23 
 Aaron Aziz, Singaporean actor, singer and film director
Kelly Macdonald, Scottish actress
February 25 – Rashida Jones, American actress, director, writer, and producer
February 28 - Ali Larter, American actress and model
February 29 - Ja Rule, American rapper and actor
March 8 – Freddie Prinze Jr., American actor, voice actor, writer and producer
March 13 – Danny Masterson, American actor and DJ
March 14
Daniel Gillies, New Zealand-Canadian actor, producer, director and screenwriter
Corey Stoll, American actor
March 15 - Brian Tee, Japanese actor
March 16 – Paul Schneider, American actor
March 21 – Rachael MacFarlane, American voice actress, singer and writer
March 22 – Reese Witherspoon, American actress, producer, and entrepreneur
March 23
 Michelle Monaghan, American actress
 Keri Russell, American actress
March 26 – Amy Smart, American actress
March 27 - Craig Wayans, American writer, producer and actor
April 1
 Troy Baker, American voice actor
 David Oyelowo, English actor, producer, director
April 5 – Sterling K. Brown, American actor
April 6 - Candace Cameron Bure, American actress, producer, author, and talk show panelist
April 13 – Jonathan Brandis, American actor (d. 2003)
April 15 – Susan Ward, American actress and model
April 17 - Maïwenn, French actress and filmmaker
April 20 – Joey Lawrence, American actor
April 23 – Gabriel Damon, American actor
April 26 – Elisabet Reinsalu, Estonian actress
April 27 – Sally Hawkins, English actress
May 1
Darius McCrary, American actor, rapper, singer and producer
Violante Placido, Italian actress and singer
May 5
Dieter Brummer, Australian actor (d. 2021)
Sage Stallone, American actor (d. 2012)
May 14 - Martine McCutcheon, English actress and singer
May 22 – Külli Teetamm, Estonian actress
May 25
Erinn Hayes, American actress and comedian
Cillian Murphy, Irish actor
Ethan Suplee, American film and television actor
J. Michael Tatum, American voice actor
May 26 - Stephen Curry (comedian), Australian comedian and actor
May 28 - Liam O'Brien, American voice actor, writer and director
May 29 – Yûsuke Iseya, Japanese actor
May 30 – Omri Katz, American retired actor
May 31 – Colin Farrell, Irish actor
June 4 - Damion Poitier, American actor and stuntman
June 8 - Eion Bailey, American actor
June 10 - Simon Fenton, English actor
June 18 - Blake Shelton, American actor and singer
June 19 - Ryan Hurst, American actor
June 21 - Dan Scanlon, American animator, storyboard artist, director and screenwriter
June 27 - Wagner Moura, Brazilian actor, director and filmmaker
June 28 - Lorraine Stanley, English actress
June 29 - Omar Doom, American actor, musician and artist
July 1 - Thomas Sadoski, American actor
July 3 - Andrea Barber, American actress and comedian
July 5
Jamie Elman, Canadian-American actor
Liberty Phoenix, American former actress
July 6 - Bashir Salahuddin, American actor, writer and comedian
July 7 - Hamish Linklater, American actor
July 9 – Fred Savage, American actor
July 15
Gabriel Iglesias, American stand-up comedian and actor
Diane Kruger, German actress
July 18 – Elsa Pataky, Spanish-Australian actress
July 19 
Benedict Cumberbatch, English actor
Vinessa Shaw, American actress and model
July 31 – Mela Lee, American voice actress
August 2 – Sam Worthington, Australian actor
August 6
 Andero Ermel, Estonian actor
Soleil Moon Frye, American actress and director
August 9 – Audrey Tautou, French actress
August 23 - Scott Caan, American actor, director and writer
August 25 – Alexander Skarsgard, Swedish actor
August 26 – Mike Colter, American actor
August 27 – Sarah Chalke, Canadian actress, model and voice artist
September 3 – Vivek Oberoi, Indian actor
September 5 – Carice van Houten, Dutch actress and singer
September 6
Domenica Cameron-Scorsese, American actress
Robin Atkin Downes, English actor and voice actor
Naomie Harris, English actress
September 9
Emma de Caunes, French actress
Lúcia Moniz, Portuguese singer and actress
September 13 - Colin Trevorrow, American filmmaker
September 20 – Enuka Okuma, Canadian actress
September 22 - Sala Baker, New Zealand actress and stuntman
September 26 – Kersti Heinloo, Estonian actress
October 3 – Seann William Scott, American actor, comedian and producer
October 4 – Alicia Silverstone, American actress
October 9
Sam Riegel, American voice actor, director and writer
Nick Swardson, American actor, stand-up comedian, screenwriter and producer
October 11 - Emily Deschanel, American actress
October 14 - Chang Chen, Taiwanese actor
October 20 – Dan Fogler, American actor, comedian and writer
October 21 – Andrew Scott, Irish actor
October 23 – Ryan Reynolds, Canadian actor and film producer
October 26 - Florence Kasumba, Ugandan-born German actress
October 31 – Piper Perabo, American actress
November 1 - Chad Lindberg, American actor
November 7 - Melyssa Ade, Canadian actress
November 24
Hiroyuki Ikeuchi, Japanese actor
Michael Roof, American actor and comedian (d. 2009)
November 28 - Ryan Kwanten, Australian actor and producer
November 29
Chadwick Boseman, American actor and playwright (d. 2020)
Anna Faris, American actress, podcaster and writer
December 7 – Mark Duplass, American filmmaker, actor, writer, and musician
December 8 – Dominic Monaghan, English actor
December 23 - Kyle Kinane, American stand-up comedian and actor
December 27 - Aaron Stanford, American actor
December 28 - Joe Manganiello, American actor
December 29
Dome Karukoski, Finnish director
Danny McBride, American actor, comedian and writer
December 31 - Chris Terrio, American screenwriter and director

Deaths

Film debuts
Victoria Abril – Robin and Marian
Shohreh Aghdashloo – The Chess Game of the Wind
Albert Brooks – Taxi Driver
Dean Cain – Elmer
James Cromwell – Murder by Death
Michael Dorn – Rocky
Bill Duke – Car Wash
Joe Flaherty – Tunnel Vision
Dexter Fletcher – Bugsy Malone
Paul Freeman – Whose Child Am I?
Richard Griffiths – It Shouldn't Happen to a Vet
Mariel Hemingway – Lipstick
Ernie Hudson – Leadbelly
Amy Irving – Carrie
Michael Kamen – The Next Man
Jessica Lange – King Kong
Jennifer Jason Leigh – The Spy Who Never Was
Delroy Lindo – Find the Lady
Mark Margolis – The Opening of Misty Beethoven
Marc McClure – Freaky Friday
Edie McClurg – Carrie
Sam McMurray – The Front
Glenn Morshower – Drive-In
Bill Murray – Next Stop, Greenwich Village
Lena Olin – Face to Face
Holmes Osborne – The Student Body
Tim Pigott-Smith – Aces High
Mary Kay Place – Bound for Glory
Jonathan Pryce – Voyage of the Damned
John Ratzenberger – The Ritz
James Rebhorn – The Yum Yum Girls
Isabella Rossellini – A Matter of Time
Cecilia Roth – No toquen a la nena
Deep Roy – The Pink Panther Strikes Again
Mercedes Ruehl – Dona Flor and Her Two Husbands
Theresa Russell – The Last Tycoon
Brooke Shields – Alice, Sweet Alice
Ron Silver – Tunnel Vision
P.J. Soles – Carrie
Holland Taylor – The Next Man
Charlene Tilton – Freaky Friday
Frank Vincent – The Death Collector
Tom Wilkinson – The Shadow Line
Debra Winger – Slumber Party '57
Chow Yun-fat – Tou tai ren

References

 
Film by year